Season 1 of So You Think You Can Dance Canada is a dance reality show and competition that airs on CTV.  It is hosted by MuchMusic VJ Leah Miller.

The series is based on the original American TV series So You Think You Can Dance. Auditions started April 7, 2008 in Vancouver, British Columbia and ended in Toronto, Ontario on June 8, 2008. The show premiered on September 11, 2008 beginning with the Toronto auditions.  The first winner was Nicholas Archambault, with Allie Bertram coming in the runner-up position.

Auditions
Open auditions for this season were held in the following locations:
April 7 - Vancouver, British Columbia - The Centre in Vancouver for Performing Arts
May 5 - Halifax, Nova Scotia -  Cunard Centre
May 12 - Calgary, Alberta - MacEwan Conference & Event Centre
May 27 - Montreal, Quebec - Theatre Saint-Denis - 700 auditioned
June 8 - Toronto, Ontario - Metro Toronto Convention Centre - approx. 1000 auditioned

Top 20 Contestants

Women

Men

Elimination chart

Performances

Week 1 (October 8, 2008)

Judges: Jean-Marc Généreux, Tré Armstrong, Blake McGrath, Luther Brown

Week 2 (October 15, 2008)
Judges: Jean-Marc Généreux, Tré Armstrong, Blake McGrath, Luther Brown

Week 3 (October 22, 2008)
Judges: Jean-Marc Généreux, Tré Armstrong, Paul Becker, Kenny Ortega

Week 4 (October 29, 2008)
Judges: Jean-Marc Généreux, Tré Armstrong, Rex Harrington, Mary Murphy

Week 5 (November 5, 2008)
Judges: Jean-Marc Généreux, Tré Armstrong, Melissa Williams, Rex Harrington

Week 6 (November 12, 2008)
Judges: Jean-Marc Généreux, Tré Armstrong, Blake McGrath, Luther Brown

Solos:

Week 7 (November 19, 2008)
Judges: Jean-Marc Généreux, Tré Armstrong, Dan Karaty, Mia Michaels

Week 8 (November 26, 2008)
Judges: Jean-Marc Généreux, Tré Armstrong, Sean Cheesman, Mary Murphy

Solos:

Week 9 (December 3, 2008)
Judges: Jean-Marc Généreux, Tré Armstrong, Luther Brown, Blake McGrath

Solos:

Results shows

Week 1 (October 9, 2008)

  Group dance: "Maculele"—Mestre Barrao Axe Capoeira (Maculelê; Choreographer: Paul Becker)
Solos:

 New partners:
 Francis Lafrenière and Natalli Reznik

Week 2 (October 16, 2008)
 Group dance: "Nagada, Nagada" from Jab We Met OST (Sonu Nigam & Javed Ali) (Bollywood; Choreographer: Nakul Dev Mahajan)
Solos:

New partners:
 None

Week 3 (October 23, 2008)
 Group dance: "Old School"—Hedley (Viennese Waltz; Choreographer: Jean-Marc Genereux)
Solos:

 New partners:
 None

Week 4 (October 30, 2008)
 Group dance: "Dragula (Hot Rod Herman Remix)"—Rob Zombie (Rock Jazz; Choreographer: Melissa Williams)
Solos:

 New partners:
 None

Week 5 (November 6, 2008)
 Group dance: "I Surrender"—Celine Dion (contemporary; Choreographer: Blake McGrath)
Solos:

 New partners:
 None. Now that only ten dancers remaining, new partners are randomly assigned each week.

Week 6 (November 13, 2008)
 Group dance: "Any Other World"—Mika (contemporary; Choreographer: Mia Michaels)
Solos:

Week 7 (November 20, 2008)
 Group dance: "Malaguena" - Brian Setzer '68 Comeback Special (Paso Doble; Choreographer: Jean-Marc Genereux)
 Solos: (all dancers had a solo regardless of status in the competition)
Solos:

Week 8 (November 27, 2008)
 Group dance: "Hollaback Girl" - Gwen Stefani (Step dance; Choreographer: Tré Armstrong)
Solos:

Finale (December 7, 2008)
Judges: Jean-Marc Généreux, Tré Armstrong, Blake McGrath, Luther Brown, Mary Murphy, Rex Harrington, Mia Michaels
 Group dances:
 Top 20: "Get Up" - 50 Cent (Hip-hop; Choreographer: Luther Brown)
 Top 20: "Do You Love Me" - The Contours (Dirty Dancing-inspired; Choreographer: Tony Meredith & Melanie LaPatin)

Judges' picks 

 Eliminated:
 Natalli Reznik
 Miles Faber
 Runner-Up:
 Allie Bertram
 Winner:
 Nico Archambault

Ratings

External links
 So You Think You Can Dance Canada
 SYTYCD Canada
 

2008 Canadian television seasons
Season 01

no:So You Think You Can Dance - Canada